Rosa salvaje (English title: Wild Rose) (is a Mexican telenovela produced by Valentín Pimstein for Televisa. The telenovela premiered on Canal de las Estrellas on July 6, 1987 and ran for 199 episodes until April 8, 1988. This telenovela was a huge success in Armenia, Nigeria, Mexico, Japan, Latin America, Italy, Bulgaria, Croatia, Serbia, Bosnia and Herzegovina, Russia, Estonia, South Korea, Ukraine, Canada the United States, and Indonesia.

Verónica Castro and Guillermo Capetillo starred as the protagonists, while Laura Zapata, Liliana Abud and Edith González starred as the antagonists. Edith González was later replaced by Felicia Mercado midway through the telenovela.

Cast

Main 
 Verónica Castro as Rosa García
 Guillermo Capetillo as Ricardo Linares / Rogelio Linares

Recurring 
 Laura Zapata as Dulcina Linares (Placed in a women's prison)
 Liliana Abud as Cándida Linares
 Claudio Báez as Federico Robles (Killed by Dulcina)
 Armando Calvo as Sebastián
 Josefina Escobedo as Felipa González
 Edith González as Leonela Villarreal 1
 Felicia Mercado as Leonela Villarreal 2 (Dies in car accident)
 Magda Guzmán as Tomasa Gonzalez
 Alexandro Landero as Rigoberto Camacho Sánchez
 Mariana Levy as Erlinda González
 Irma Lozano as Paulette Montero de Mendizábal
 Alberto Mayagoitia as Pablo Mendizábal
 Gloria Morell as Eduvigez
 Beatriz Ornellas as Caridad
 Patricia Pereyra as Norma
 Renata Flores as Leopoldina (Killed by Dulcina)
 Gastón Tuset as Roque Mendizábal 
 Antonio Valencia as Guest in the house of the Linares family
 Liliana Weimer as Vanessa de Reynoso
 Rossana Cesarman as Celia

 Eduardo Borja as Hilario
 Arturo Guízar as Rufino
 Ari Telch as Jorge Andueza
 Carmen Cortés as Doña Filomena

 Jorge Granillo as Palillo
 Tito Livio Baccarin as Tito
 Julio Andrés López as Périco
 Adrián Martínez as Adrián "El Muelas"

Episodes 
The following is a list of episodes published by Blim. In the list of episodes are available only 11 episodes.

Awards

References

External links

Russian telenovela site (in English).

1987 telenovelas
Mexican telenovelas
Televisa telenovelas
1987 Mexican television series debuts
1988 Mexican television series endings
Television shows set in Mexico City
Mexican television series based on Venezuelan television series
Spanish-language telenovelas